Sergey Nikolayevich Krivenko (1 February 1847, Borisoglebsk, Imperial Russia, — 18 June 1906, Tuapse, Imperial Russia) was a Russian journalist, publicist and editor associated with the Narodnik movement. In the 1870s and early 1880s he was one of the prominent figures in Otechestvennye Zapiski where, starting form 1881 he was the editor of the Internal Affairs review section.

In 1883 Krivenko was arrested and in 1885 deported to Western Siberia. In 1890 he returned and in 1891, alongside Konstantin Stanyukovich, started to co-edit Russkoye Bogatstvo. Later he joined the staff of Novoye Slovo magazine. He authored numerous essays on the current Russian economic affairs, some of which, concerning the development of a workers' artels, were collected and came out as a separate edition, part of The Artel Collection series.

References 

Russian journalists
Russian male essayists
Russian editors
People from Borisoglebsk
1847 births
1906 deaths